Events from the 1160s in England.

Incumbents
Monarch – Henry II

Events
 1160
 2 November – marriage of Henry the Young King and Marguerite, daughter of Louis VII of France; King Henry II takes control of Norman Vexin.
 The island of Lundy is granted to the Knights Templar by Henry II.
 Approximate date – Derby School is founded by Walkelin de Derby in Derby; it will survive until 1989.
 1161
 5 January – canonisation of Edward the Confessor.
 c. April – Bartholomew becomes Bishop of Exeter.
 1162
 3 June – Thomas Becket consecrated as Archbishop of Canterbury and resigns as Lord Chancellor.
 Becket decrees that Trinity Sunday should henceforth be celebrated in England.
 King Henry II raises the Danegeld (by now, merely a royal tax) for the last time.
 1163
 January – Henry II suppresses a revolt in Wales, and captures Prince Rhys ap Gruffydd.
 6 March – Gilbert Foliot is translated from Hereford to become Bishop of London, an office which he will hold until his death in 1187.
 1 July – Henry calls the Welsh princes and King Malcolm IV of Scotland to do homage at Woodstock Palace; the Welsh rebel.
 1 October – Becket resists Henry II's demands to extend the jurisdiction of secular courts to the clergy.
 13 October – the bones of Edward the Confessor are translated to Westminster Abbey.
 John of Salisbury completes his Life of Anselm.
 1164
 30 January – Henry II enacts the Constitutions of Clarendon (at Clarendon Palace in Wiltshire) in an attempt to restore royal jurisdiction over the Church.
 2 November – Becket found guilty of contempt of court and goes into exile to the Continent.
 1165
 July – Henry II fails to quell a rebellion in Wales.
 1166
 July – Henry II conquers Brittany, granting the territory to his son Geoffrey.
 Henry enacts the Assize of Clarendon, reforming the law, underpinning the importance of jury trial and defining the legal duties of sheriffs.
 Anglo-Norman soldier William Marshal is knighted while on campaign in Normandy; he will be described as "the greatest knight that ever lived".
 1167
 The exiled King of Leinster, Diarmait Mac Murchada, having paid homage to Henry, begins to recruit Norman knights for an invasion of Ireland.
 Increased enrolment at the University of Oxford after English students are barred from attending Paris University.
 Earliest likely date for construction of building much later known as Marlipins Museum in Shoreham-by-Sea commencing, one of the earliest surviving secular buildings in England.
 1168
 1 February – Henry II's daughter, Matilda, marries Henry the Lion, Duke of Saxony.
 1169
 January – Treaty of Montmirail: Henry II agrees to divide his French territories amongst his sons; Aquitaine to Richard, Brittany to Geoffrey, and the remainder to Henry.
 1 May – Norman barons land an invasion force at Wexford in support of Dermot.

Births
 1162
 13 October – Leonora of England, queen of Alfonso VIII of Castile (died 1214)
Richard de Clare, 4th Earl of Hertford (died 1218)
 1165
 October – Joan of England, Queen of Sicily, daughter of Henry II of England (died 1199)
 1166
 24 December – John of England (died 1216)
 William de Warenne, 5th Earl of Surrey (died 1240)

Deaths
 1161
 18 April – Theobald of Bec, Archbishop of Canterbury (born c. 1090)
 1166
 c. 27 December – Robert de Chesney, Bishop of Lincoln
 1167
 12 January – Aelred of Rievaulx, abbot (born 1110)
 27 February – Robert of Melun, theologian and bishop (born c. 1100)
 10 September – Empress Matilda, first female ruler of England (born 1102)
 1168
 5 April – Robert de Beaumont, 2nd Earl of Leicester, Justiciar (born 1104)
 1169
 July – Hilary of Chichester, bishop (born c. 1110)

References